Bill Davies (20 January 1930 – 1 November 2003) was a former Australian rules footballer who played with Footscray in the Victorian Football League (VFL).

Notes

External links 
		

1930 births
2003 deaths
Australian rules footballers from Victoria (Australia)
Western Bulldogs players
Chelsea Football Club (Australia) players